Havelland is a district or county in Brandenburg, Germany. It is bounded by (from the north and clockwise) the districts of Ostprignitz-Ruppin and Oberhavel, the city-state of Berlin, the district of Potsdam-Mittelmark, the city of Brandenburg and the state of Saxony-Anhalt (districts of Jerichower Land and Stendal).

History
The district was established in 1993 by merging the former districts of Nauen and Rathenow.

Demography

Geography
Geographically the Havelland refers to the land either side of the Havel river and the area surrounded by the large "U" bend in its course between the city of Berlin and its confluence with the Elbe river. The district mainly consists of the areas north of the Havel river.

Coat of arms

The red eagle is the heraldic animal of Brandenburg. The head of the eagle is part of the coat of arms of Rathenow. The swan is often used as a symbol for the Havelland region.

Towns and municipalities

References

External links

Official website (German)
tourist website (German, English)